Stadio Valentino Mazzola is a multi-use stadium in Santarcangelo di Romagna, Italy.  It is used mostly for football matches and is the home ground of Santarcangelo Calcio. The stadium holds 3,000.

External links
Stadio Valentino Mazzola at Soccerway

Valentino Mazzola